Noor Aishah binti Mohammad Salim  (Jawi: نور عايشه محمد سليم; born 21 May 1933) is the widowed wife of former President Yusof Ishak.

Early life
Noor Aishah was born in Penang in 1933, and was adopted by Mohammad Salim Jusoh (born Barney Perkins) and Fatimah Ali.

She married Yusof Ishak on 20 November 1949, at the age of 16.

Spouse of the president of Singapore
Noor Aishah was patron for the Singapore Red Cross, the Young Women's Muslim Association, and the Girl Guides Association.

Girl Guides
Noor Aishah became the first Asian president of the Singapore Girl Guides Association (now Girl Guides Singapore) in 1959. In 1965, she became the patron of the movement. She was awarded the Laurel Leaf, the highest award of the Singapore Girl Guides' Association, in 1970.

Veteran Guiding leaders credit her with helping to raise funds for the movement when funding was scarce, and with helping to secure a plot of land for their headquarters in the Clemenceau area in the 1960s. The Girl Guides named the Puan Noor Aishah Award after her.

Awards
Noor Aishah was awarded the Pingat Bakti Chemerlang (Distinguished Service Medal; later replaced by the Darjah Utama Bakti Cemerlang, or Distinguished Service Order) in 1964 for her work in social welfare.

References 

 

1933 births
First ladies and gentlemen of Singapore
Singaporean people of Malay descent
Singaporean Muslims
Living people